Ferrie is a surname. Notable people with the surname include:

People
Adam Ferrie (1777–1863), early Canadian businessman and political figure who lived much of his life in Ireland
Colin Campbell Ferrie (1808–1856), Canadian merchant, banker, and politician
David Ferrie (1918–1967), private investigator and pilot who allegedly plotted to assassinate President John F. Kennedy
Ferrie Bodde (born 1982), Dutch footballer who plays for Swansea City
Gladstone Ferrie (1892–1955), Liberal party member of the Canadian House of Commons
Gordon Ferrie Hull (1870–1956), Canadian / American teacher, mathematician and physicist
Gustave-Auguste Ferrié (1868–1932), French radio pioneer and army general
Kenneth Ferrie (born 1978), English professional golfer
Tracy Ferrie, one of two current bass players of Christian metal band Stryper

Settlements
Ferrie Township, a geographic township that is part of the municipality of Whitestone, Ontario, Canada

See also
Ferri (disambiguation)
Ferry (disambiguation)

de:Ferrié